Alex Luna may refer to:

 Alex Luna (singer) (born 1986), Ukrainian countertenor
 Alex Luna (footballer) (born 2004), Argentine attacking midfielder